The 1958 Massachusetts gubernatorial election was held on November 4, 1958.  Democrat Foster Furcolo was elected Governor of Massachusetts for a second term, defeating Republican Charles Gibbons, Socialist Labor candidate Henning A. Blomen, and Prohibition candidate Guy S. Williams.

Democratic primary

Candidates 
 Foster Furcolo, incumbent Governor

Results 
Governor Furcolo was unopposed for renomination.

Republican primary

Candidates 
 George Fingold, Massachusetts Attorney General (died August 31)

Write-in candidates 
 Charles Gibbons, former Speaker of the Massachusetts House of Representatives and nominee for Lt. Governor in 1956
 Joseph P. McKay, Assistant Attorney General
 John Volpe, former Public Works Commissioner

Campaign 
Attorney General George Fingold was unopposed in the Republican primary.

On August 31, 1958, Fingold died unexpectedly at his home in Concord, Massachusetts. As his death occurred only nine days before the primary, Fingold was the only candidate for Governor on the Republican ballot. Former Speaker of the Massachusetts House of Representatives Charles Gibbons, former State Public Works Commissioner John A. Volpe, and Assistant Attorney General Joseph P. McKay ran as write-in candidates.

Results

General election

Results

See also
 1957–1958 Massachusetts legislature

References

1958
Gubernatorial
1958 United States gubernatorial elections
November 1958 events in the United States